Valverde is a Spanish surname, and may refer to:

 Alejandro Valverde (born 1980), Spanish cyclist 
 Amelia Valverde, (born 1987), Costa Rican football manager
 Ana Valverde (1798–1864), Dominican activist
 Ernesto Valverde (born 1964), Spanish football manager and former player
 Federico Valverde (born 1998), Uruguayan footballer
 Ísis Valverde (born 1987), Brazilian actress
 Joaquín Valverde Durán (1846–1910), Spanish composer of zarzuelas, flautist and conductor
 Joaquín "Quinito" Valverde Sanjuán (1875–1918), Spanish composer of zarzuelas, son of the preceding
 José María Valverde, Spanish poet and philosopher, Rector of the University of Barcelona
 José Valverde (born 1978), Major League Baseball player
 Juan de Valverde (born 1525), published a book about anatomy 
 María Valverde (born 1987), Spanish actress
 Mariana Valverde, Professor of Criminology in the Centre of Criminology's Faculty at the University of Toronto, located in Toronto, Ontario, Canada
Mary Valverde (born 1975) artist 
 Vincente de Valverde (born 1490), Spanish bishop active in Peru

See also
 Jesús Malverde, Mexican folk saint and bandit.

Spanish-language surnames